Clay Township is a township in Clay County, Iowa, USA.  As of the 2000 census, its population was 696.

History
Clay Township was the first township in Clay County. When it was created in 1859, it comprised the entire county.

Geography
According to the USGS, it contains three cemeteries: Center, TriMello and Willow Creek.

Transportation
Clay Township contains one airport or landing strip, Royal Airport.

Notes

References
 USGS Geographic Names Information System (GNIS)

External links
 US-Counties.com
 City-Data.com

Townships in Clay County, Iowa
Townships in Iowa